XBR may refer to:

 X-band radar
 Sea-based X-band Radar
 XBR (Sony) the Sony Trademark
 IATA airport code XBR: Brockville Regional Tackaberry Airport, serving Brockville, Ontario, Canada
 The XBR family of Pixel-art scaling algorithms